Don Bosco College, Tura was established in 1987 to provide education to the people of Meghalaya. The college employs over 100 teaching and support personnel. The college enrolls over 2000 students from the various states of North East India.  In addition to its co-educational high school, Don Bosco College Tura offers Bachelor of Science, Bachelor of Arts, Bachelor of Commerce, and Bachelor of Business Administration degrees.

Don Bosco College follows the educational principles of Saint John Bosco.

References

External links
Official website

Educational institutions established in 1987
Tura, Meghalaya
High schools and secondary schools in Meghalaya
Colleges affiliated to North-Eastern Hill University
Universities and colleges in Meghalaya
1987 establishments in Meghalaya